Dallas Preston Kruse is the producer of Suburban Legends' 2007 Japan-only album Dance Like Nobody's Watching: Tokyo Nights, an extended version of their 2006 EP release; their 2007 album, Infectious, and their 2008 album, Let's Be Friends... and Slay the Dragon Together. Dallas often performs live with the band at local shows as a keyboard player, although he has not been listed in any Suburban Legends material or website as an official member of the band due to his commitments as a producer and on-call musician.

Dallas is also the producer/MD/keyboardist for artist Justin Grennan, Moderne Man, Ryan Calhoun, Barrett Johnson, Ryan Calhoun, Brock Baker, Jameson, Skyler Stonestreet, The Ultimate Bearhug, and many more.

Owner of ZionStudios, in Orange County, CA., Dallas is a top call Producer, Keyboardist, Arranger, Composer, and multi-instrumentalist.

External links
Official website (As a Producer)

Suburban Legends members
Year of birth missing (living people)
Living people
21st-century American keyboardists